Beginning in 1979 and lasting through the early 1980s, a series of agreements between the Iowa Department of Transportation and individual county boards of supervisors led to a mass transfer of jurisdiction of several state highways in Iowa.  County boards of supervisors were asked to convene functional classification boards in order to review the classification all of the highway miles within each respective county.  Control of roads that were classified as trunk roads or trunk collector roads were transferred to the counties, while roads classified as arteries or arterial collectors were transferred to the state department of transportation.  The vast majority of transfers took place in 1980.

Background
The 67th Iowa General Assembly passed a bill in 1978 that changed how the state department of transportation (DOT) classified highways and how they were funded throughout the state. The bill enacted an existing framework for county boards of supervisors to create reclassification boards that could appeal to a state board if certain changes to the road network were not satisfactory. The state's road use tax fund, which is the mechanism for allocating funds to the different levels of government for different levels of road, had both its inputs and outputs modified.

The state was attempting to offset the effects the 1970s energy crisis and the 1973–75 recession which strained state budgets by reducing income due to reduced demand for gasoline and increasing inflation. The idea was for the DOT to save operational money by offloading minor highways to the respective counties. State planners sought to offload nearly one-third of the primary system. Naturally, county officials, whose road budgets were similarly strained, balked at the idea.

The Iowa Code provided a manner for determining the class of a particular highway. Each county was to appoint a three-member board, one of whom was to be a state DOT employee, one a county engineer or supervisor, and the other a municipal leader chosen by a majority of mayors in the county. The board was to classify each mile of roads and streets in the county into one of twelve categories. Only three categories applied to primary highways–freeways and expressways, arterials, and arterial connectors. The freeway-expressway and arterial systems had limits on total mileage, respectively. The only other requirement of the reclassification boards was to ensure network continuity between counties.

County officials were not keen on the idea of taking over more highway miles from the state when their own road budgets were tight.  Clarke County officials sued the state classification board when it suggested the county take over an  portion of U.S. Highway 69 (US 69).  They felt the DOT was attempting to dump unwanted highway miles, which were also in poor condition, on a county unwilling to accept them.  Some counties felt pressure to accept roads from the state that the DOT had not maintained adequately.  Grundy County had some success by reclassifying some roads slated for transfer, such as Iowa Highway 214 (Iowa 214) into Wellsburg.  That highway was reclassified as an arterial collector extension, keeping in spirit with an agreement it had with the DOT to maintain the highway until "Interstate 520" was built.  Other counties had appeals heard at the DOT headquarters in Ames.

Construction of new highways, such as Interstate 380 (I-380) would cause a chain reaction in other state highways.  It was predicted in 1979 that opening I-380 in the Cedar Rapids area would cause Iowa 150 to lose its status as a primary highway because the route ran roughly parallel to the planned Interstate Highway's corridor.  Indeed, when I-380 opened to traffic in 1984, Iowa 150 was rerouted away from Cedar Rapids over Iowa 101 to Vinton.  One section of Iowa 150 along Collins Road in Cedar Rapids was still classified as an arterial connector; it became Iowa 100.

One provision in the Iowa Code required whichever agency maintained a section of highway previously to either repair the highway in question or to pay an appropriate amount of money equal to the costs of repairing the road to the agency receiving the road.  In Johnson County, state and county officials had difficulty reaching an agreement on a former segment of Iowa 1, by then renumbered Iowa 979.  County officials wanted the state to take over County Road W66 (CR W66) from I-80 to the west overlook of Coralville Lake.  The state countered with an offer to pay to upgrade Iowa 979 as well as have the county take over three other highways in the county.  The two sides were not any closer 18 months later when the DOT was ready to open a new four-lane US 218 south of Iowa City.  The routes for which no agreement could be made were ultimately kept by the DOT and assigned new route numbers, as was the case with Iowa 979.

Routes removed
Lengths represent the distances removed from the state highway system

Routes added

Existing route changes
{|class="wikitable sortable plainrowheaders"
!scope="col" rowspan=2 | Number
!colspan=2 class=unsortable|Change in length
!scope="col" class="unsortable" rowspan=2 | Southern or western terminus
!scope="col" class="unsortable" rowspan=2 | Northern or eastern terminus
!scope="col" data-sort-type="date" rowspan=2 | Formed
!scope="col" data-sort-type="date" rowspan=2 | Removed
!scope="col" class="unsortable" rowspan=2 | Notes
|-
!scope="col" data-sort-type="number" | mi
!scope="col" data-sort-type="number" | km
|-

Notes

References

External links

 
Transportation in Iowa
Highways